Madison Area Technical College (Madison College) is a public technical and community college based in Madison, Wisconsin. It serves students in parts of 12 counties in south-central Wisconsin: Adams, Columbia, Dane, Dodge, Green, Iowa, Jefferson, Juneau, Marquette, Richland, Rock, and Sauk.

Campus locations include several throughout the city of Madison and four regional sites in the cities of Reedsburg, Watertown, Fort Atkinson, and Portage.

It is among the largest of the 16 schools in the Wisconsin Technical College System. Madison College had a total enrollment of 30,065 in the 2019 - 2020 academic year. According to the 2019 Graduate Report, 92% of students found a job within six months of graduation.

History
The college was founded in 1912 as the Madison Continuation School, providing vocational education, citizenship, and homemaking classes. In 1921, it moved into a building next to the former Madison Central High School in downtown Madison and became known as Madison Vocational School.

In response to the Great Depression, the Madison Vocational School created non-credit, continuing education courses in artisan crafts, such as millinery, woodworking, and chair-caning. During the 1942–43 academic year, courses met on the third shift to teach skills needed for wartime manufacturing jobs. In 1950 purchased a Baptist church building as an addition.

Starting in 1966, the college offered college-transfer and credit-bearing courses. In 1987, the primary campus shifted to a larger, east-side facility, built near the Truax Field Dane County Regional Airport.

In 2012, a state referendum funded physical updates at regional campuses and new construction at the Truax campus.

Nickname change
In 2010 the college began to refer to itself as "Madison College", in part to help end confusion with Milwaukee Area Technical College (also known as "MATC"). The official name of the school remains Madison Area Technical College.

Facilities upgrade
On November 2, 2010, 60 percent of voters supported the Madison College Smart Community Plan, a $133,770,000 plan for new facilities, renovations, and upgrades to meet the increasing demand for education and job training. Projects included in the plan were a Health Education Building, including a public clinic, dental hygiene clinic, and massage therapy clinic; a Protective Service Center; an emergency vehicle operations course; the Truax gateway, which contains a library, student achievement center, and enrollment center; and new classrooms, labs, and learning centers at the regional campuses in Fort Atkinson, Reedsburg, Portage, and Watertown.

In response to the need for accessible, quality higher education facilities and community gathering spaces in Madison's most underserved part of the city, Madison College opened its new Goodman South Campus in Fall 2019. This $23 million, state-of-the-art facility was funded largely by private donations.

Academics
The school offers more than 180 associate degrees and technical diploma programs, as well as trade apprenticeships and other certifications.

The Liberal Arts transfer program offers associate of arts and associate of sciences degrees that satisfy the first two years of general studies at some four-year institutions. Madison College has seven tailored liberal arts pre-majors designed for transfer. The University of Wisconsin--Madison is the school's largest transfer partner.

Madison College offers 11 areas of study:

 Architecture & Engineering 
 Arts, Design & Humanities 
 Business 
 Construction, Manufacturing & Maintenance
 Culinary, Hospitality & Fitness 
 Education & Social Sciences 
 Health Sciences 
 Information Technology 
 Law, Protective & Human Services  
 Science, Math and Natural Resources 
 Transportation

In addition to traditional, in-person, campus-based courses, the college offers degrees and courses in online and hybrid models.

Adult continuing education programs offer non-credit professional and personal development classes. In 2014, Madison College began to offer digital badges for learning.

Madison College welcomes students from diverse experiences:

 High school students 
 International students 
 Returning students 
 Students with disabilities 
 Transfer students
 Veterans 
 Regional students from outside of Madison

Financial aid and scholarships are available for students who need help paying for college.

Athletics
The Madison College Wolfpack is a member of the NJCAA Division III (North Central Community College Conference) for all sports except for Baseball & Softball (Division II).

Madison College Teams:

 Men’s Baseball, Basketball, Golf, Soccer 
 Women’s Basketball, Soccer, Softball, Volleyball 
 Co-Ed Esports

Notable people
Robert Dwayne Gruss, Roman Catholic bishop
Steve Hilgenberg, Wisconsin State Assembly
Debi Laszewski, Professional female bodybuilder
Joe Parisi, Dane County Executive

References

External links
Official website

 
Wisconsin technical colleges
Education in Madison, Wisconsin
Educational institutions established in 1912
Education in Columbia County, Wisconsin
1912 establishments in Wisconsin
NJCAA athletics